Karangi may refer to:
 Karangi, New South Wales, Australia
 Karangi, India
 Karangi, Iran, a village in West Azerbaijan Province, Iran